The Ambassador of Australia to France is an officer of the Australian Department of Foreign Affairs and Trade and the head of the Embassy of the Commonwealth of Australia to the French Republic. The position has the rank and status of an Ambassador Extraordinary and Plenipotentiary and holds non-resident accreditation for Algeria, Mauritania (since 2001), Monaco. From April 1976 to March 1991 there was a resident Ambassador in Algeria and has since been held by the ambassador, excepting a period from 1999–2002 when it was held by the Ambassador in Cairo. From October 1972 – August 1975, October 1976 – August 1978, January 1988 – September 1990, and March 1994 – September 1996 the Ambassador served as Permanent Delegate of Australia to UNESCO, a role that is now held by the Deputy Head of Mission. The Deputy Head also serves as the non-resident accredited Ambassador to Chad. From 1978 to 2017, the ambassador had responsibility for relations with Morocco until the establishment of a resident embassy in Rabat.

The current Ambassador, since November 2020 is Gillian Bird . France and Australia have enjoyed official diplomatic relations since 1945 when Australia opened its Legation in Paris. The Legation was upgraded to Embassy status in 1948, when Colonel William Hodgson, who served as Minister to France, was appointed as Ambassador.

List of officeholders

Minister and Ambassadors to France

Ambassadors to Algeria

Notes
A. Also non-resident Ambassador to the People's Democratic Republic of Algeria, 1991–2000, 2014–present.
B. Also non-resident Ambassador to the Islamic Republic of Mauritania, 2001–present.
C. Also Permanent Delegate of Australia to UNESCO, October 1972–August 1975, October 1976–August 1978, January 1988–September 1990, and March 1994–September 1996.
D. Also non-resident Ambassador to the Principality of Monaco, 3 May 2007–present.
E. Also non-resident Ambassador to the Kingdom of Morocco, 1978–2007.

See also
France–Australia relations
Australia–Morocco relations
Foreign relations of Australia

References

External links
Australian Embassy, France

 
+
 
 
 
 
 
France
Australia